Galgberget (the Gallow Hill) is a nature reserve just north of Visby on Gotland, Sweden. The area is bounded to the west by the cliff edge, in the east by County Road 149, and in the south by the town of Visby.

Galgberget is named after the still remaining gallows, built during the 13th century, where local criminals used to be executed. It is claimed to be the only preserved Medieval execution site in Europe. The gallows consist of a low, circular stone wall with three pillars of stone rising from it. Wooden beams rested on the pillars, and criminals were hanged from these using ropes and hooks. It is believed that the gallows were in use until 1845. The gallows were situated so that there was a clear view of them in Visby and from the sea, so that everyone could view those who had been executed. In July 2008, archaeologists from the Gotland Museum found the bones of some 30 people who had been executed, presumably on the spot, in an achaeological trench inside the stone circle of the gallows.

The area has barren vegetation due to its limestone constitution, the most common plant being Prunus spinosa, commonly called the blackthorn or sloe. It is a popular hiking area. Galgberget also has the ruin of a lime kiln and a disused motor stadium. , there are also a number of recently built apartment houses.

During the Medieval Week reenactment of the Battle of Visby in 2008, the local branch of the Society for Creative Anachronism organized a medieval tent camp at Galgberget.

References

External links 

 Summer's archaeological survey of Galgberget - Interview with archaeologist Per Widerström

Visby
Nature reserves in Sweden
Tourist attractions in Gotland County
Execution sites